Alex Rafael da Silva Antônio  (born January 1, 1988), also known as Alex Rafael, is a Brazilian footballer who plays as a forward.

Early life
Alex Rafael was born in São Paulo. He began his career in 2008 playing for the domestic team Red Bull Brazil. After a short period of a month he became one of the first players to play for the Salzburg club in Austria. He signed a year contract within a week. Shortly after he returned to Brazil to play for Commercial, which later loaned him to Thespa Kusatsu in Japan. Finally he was loaned back to Brazil to play for Ferroviaria in 2013. In a January 2017 he signed a contract with Al Shamal.

Honour
Ubon UMT United

Regional League Division 2:
Winners : 2015
Regional League North-East Division
 Runner-up : 2015

References

External links

1988 births
Living people
Brazilian footballers
Austrian Football Bundesliga players
Red Bull Brasil players
FC Red Bull Salzburg players
Expatriate footballers in Austria
J2 League players
Thespakusatsu Gunma players
Alex Rafael
Alex Rafael
Brazilian expatriate sportspeople in Thailand
Expatriate footballers in Thailand
Al-Shamal SC players
Expatriate footballers in Qatar
Brazilian expatriate footballers
Expatriate footballers in Japan
Ras Al Khaimah Club players
Expatriate footballers in the United Arab Emirates
UAE First Division League players
Qatari Second Division players
Association football forwards
Footballers from São Paulo